N. montana may refer to:

Neogurelca montana, a moth of the family Sphingidae
Neriene montana, a spider of the family Linyphiidae
Nestegis montana, the narrow-leaved maire, a New Zealand tree
Nyctemera montana, a moth of the family Erebidae